(September 6, 1834 – October 17, 1903) was a Japanese daimyō of the late Edo period, who ruled the Takamatsu Domain. Yoritoshi was the son-in-law of Ii Naosuke. His court title was Sanuki no kami. Yoritoshi was adopted as heir to Matsudaira Yoritane, the incumbent lord of Takamatsu, in 1853, and succeeded Yoritane as lord in 1861. Under his leadership, Takamatsu forces supported the security operations of the Tokugawa shogunate in the Kyoto area. During the Kinmon Incident, Takamatsu troops helped defend the imperial palace. His forces took part in the Battle of Toba–Fushimi, and in response, the imperial court stripped him of rank and title. Yoritoshi then put himself under domiciliary confinement, and had a senior retainer executed; this led to an imperial pardon.

Yoritoshi became a count (hakushaku) in the kazoku nobility in 1884, and died in 1903. His son Yorinaga Matsudaira succeeded him as count.

Ancestry

References

Totman, Conrad. Collapse of the Tokugawa Bakufu, 1862–1868. Honolulu: University of Hawai'i Press, 1980.

Daimyo
Kazoku
People of the Boshin War
Matsudaira clan
1834 births
1903 deaths